Robert Ross Lurtsema (born March 29, 1942) is a former American football defensive end in the National Football League for the Minnesota Vikings, New York Giants and Seattle Seahawks. He played in two Super Bowls with the Vikings.

Born in Grand Rapids, Michigan, Lurtsema attended Ottawa Hills High School and initially went to Michigan Tech in 1962 on a basketball scholarship, but started playing football and lettered in the sport as a Huskie in  the 1962 season. Lurtsema transferred to Western Michigan University to continue his collegiate career, lettering in football as a Bronco in 1965. Undrafted after graduating, Lurtsema played for the 1966 Harrisburg Capitals of the Atlantic Coast Football League, which was a taxi squad affiliated with the Baltimore Colts. Don Shula, Colts coach, had drafted Bubba Smith in 1967, blocking an opportunity for Lurtsema. Shula arranged a trade to the New York Giants. Lurtsema said of Shula, "I owe everything to Shula. He basically set up my whole career.  I can’t say enough good things about him.”

Lurtsema played with the New York Giants for 1967, making the all-rookie team in 1967 and the Sporting News All-Star team in 1968. He became a regular starter for the Giants through the 1971 season, changing positions in 1970 from defensive tackle to defensive end, but the Giants waived him at the end of the 1971 season.

The Minnesota Vikings signed Lurtsema in 1972. In the third game of the Miami Dolphins 1972 NFL season, the Dolphins appeared to be on the way to losing a game against the Vikings. Lurtsema was flagged for roughing the passer in a pivotal play in the game, and for the Dolphins' season, as they ended up undefeated. Lurtsema played regularly for the Vikings and back up the famed Purple People Eaters defensive line, but he rarely started, earning the affectionate nickname "Benchwarmer Bob." Lurtsema played for the Vikings in Super Bowl VIII in 1974 and Super Bowl IX in 1975, both losing causes.

The Vikings traded Lurtsema to the Seattle Seahawks, an expansion team in their first season in 1976 in a deal for wide receiver Ahmad Rashad. Lurtsema played two seasons in Seattle, starting regularly at defensive end. He retired after the 1977 NFL season with 82 career starts.

After retirement, Lurtsema often appeared as "Benchwarmer Bob" in TCF Bank (TCF Savings and Loan) television commercials.

Lurtsema - TCF Commercials

Lurtsema pitched for the Minnesota Norsemen professional softball team during their 1979 season in the American Professional Slo-Pitch League (APSPL).  He also owned Benchwarmer Bob's Sports Cafe, which had two locations in the Twin Cities.

In 2013 Lurtsema signed on to support the lawsuit brought against the NFL in regard to concussions in the sport. He advocated for the funds to be used for players impacted by injuries and for research into brain injuries. Lurtsema and his wife Aloise are retired and live in Minnesota.

References

External links
Career Statistics at NFL.com
Career Statistics at Pro Football Reference

1942 births
Living people
American football defensive linemen
New York Giants players
Minnesota Vikings players
Seattle Seahawks players
Western Michigan Broncos football players
Michigan Tech Huskies football players
Players of American football from Grand Rapids, Michigan